Piz Surgonda is a mountain of the Albula Alps, located north of the Julier Pass in the canton of Graubünden. It lies on the range surrounding the Val Bever, east of Piz d'Agnel.

Piz Surgonda is composed of two summits of almost equal height: the western summit (3,193 m) and the eastern summit (3,196 m).

References

External links
 Piz Surgonda on Hikr

Mountains of the Alps
Mountains of Graubünden
Mountains of Switzerland